This is a list of municipalities in Cuba which have standing links to local communities in other countries. In most cases, the association, especially when formalised by local government, is known as "town twinning" (usually in Europe) or "sister cities" (usually in the rest of the world).

B
Baracoa
 Roccarainola, Italy

Batabanó
 Santa Cruz de Juventino Rosas, Mexico

Bayamo
 Savona, Italy

C
Caibarién

 Bloomington, United States
 Normal, United States

Caimito
 Barañain, Spain

Camagüey

 Madison, United States
 Mérida, Mexico
 Novelda, Spain

Cárdenas
 Paracho, Mexico

Cauto Cristo
 Rialto, Italy

Cienfuegos

 Bahía Blanca, Argentina
 Cuenca, Ecuador
 Etzatlán, Mexico
 Kingston, Canada
 Tacoma, United States

Colón
 Calkiní, Mexico

G
Guantánamo
 Ixtapan de la Sal, Mexico

Guisa
 Ceriana, Italy

H
Havana

 Ankara, Turkey
 Barcelona, Spain
 Beijing, China
 Belo Horizonte, Brazil
 Brasília, Brazil
 Brazzaville, Congo
 Cádiz, Spain
 Constanța, Romania
 Cusco, Peru
 Florianópolis, Brazil
 Gijón, Spain
 Glasgow, Scotland, United Kingdom
 Isfahan, Iran
 İzmir, Turkey
 Jundiaí, Brazil
 Kyiv, Ukraine
 León, Mexico
 Madrid, Spain
 Mexico City, Mexico
 Minsk, Belarus
 Mobile, United States
 Montevideo, Uruguay
 Oaxaca de Juárez, Mexico
 Oran, Algeria
 La Paz, Bolivia
 Rio de Janeiro, Brazil
 Rotterdam, Netherlands
 Saint Petersburg, Russia
 Salvador, Brazil
 Santos, Brazil
 São Bernardo do Campo, Brazil
 São Paulo, Brazil
 São Vicente, Brazil
 Seville, Spain
 Tehran, Iran
 Tijuana, Mexico
 Valparaíso, Chile
 Veracruz, Mexico

Havana – Arroyo Naranjo
 Leganés, Spain

Havana – Boyeros

 Guarulhos, Brazil
 Reus, Spain
 Rubí, Spain
 Tepebaşı, Turkey

Havana – Cerro

 Mexico City, Mexico
 Nilüfer, Turkey

Havana – Cotorro
 Campinas, Brazil

Havana – Diez de Octubre
 Cuautitlán Izcalli, Mexico

Havana – Habana del Este

 Casarrubuelos, Spain
 Santa Coloma de Gramenet, Spain

Havana – La Lisa

 Albacete, Spain
 Ivry-sur-Seine, France

Havana – Marianao

 Irapuato, Mexico
 Sant Boi de Llobregat, Spain
 Santa Ana, Costa Rica
 Zapopan, Mexico

Havana – Old Havana

 Córdoba, Spain
 Guanajuato, Mexico
 Isla Mujeres, Mexico
 Morelia, Mexico
 San Miguel de Allende, Mexico
 Sintra, Portugal
 Toledo, Spain
 Torrelavega, Spain

Havana – Playa

 Créteil, France
 Santa Fe, Spain

Havana – Plaza de la Revolución
 Ourense, Spain

Havana – Regla

 Almada, Portugal
 Richmond, United States

Havana – San Miguel del Padrón
 Mieres, Spain

Holguín

 Saltillo, Mexico
 Santa Fe, United States
 São Vicente, Brazil

J
Jaruco
 Tarquinia, Italy

Jovellanos
 Erongarícuaro, Mexico

L
Limonar
 Tingambato, Mexico

M
Mariel
 Cornellà de Llobregat, Spain

Martí
 Nahuatzen, Mexico

Matanzas

 Campeche, Mexico
 León, Spain
 Morelia, Mexico
 Nizhny Novgorod, Russia
 Pittsburgh, United States
 Uruapan, Mexico
 Vilanova i la Geltrú, Spain

N
Niquero
 Tuxpan, Mexico

P
Palma Soriano
 Berkeley, United States

Pedro Betancourt

 Nuevo Parangaricutiro, Mexico
 Tancítaro, Mexico

Perico

 Peribán, Mexico
 Ziracuaretiro, Mexico

Pinar del Río
 Dos Hermanas, Spain

R
Remedios

 Ann Arbor, United States
 Bloomington, United States
 Normal, United States

Río Cauto
 Arnasco, Italy

S
San Antonio de los Baños

 Châlette-sur-Loing, France
 Mexico City, Mexico
 Zapotlanejo, Mexico

San José de las Lajas

 Badajoz, Spain
 Coslada, Spain

Sancti Spíritus

 Novellara, Italy
 La Orotava, Spain

Santa Clara

 Cheboksary, Russia
 Bloomington, United States
 Oviedo, Spain
 Rosario, Argentina

Santa Cruz del Norte
 Santa Cruz de Tenerife, Spain

Santiago de Cuba

 Le Lamentin, Martinique, France
 Naples, Italy
 Oakland, United States
 Palermo, Italy
 Paraná, Argentina
 Rosario, Argentina
 Saint Petersburg, Russia
 San Bartolomé de Tirajana, Spain
 Santiago, Mexico

T
Taguasco
 La Victoria de Acentejo, Spain

Trinidad
 San Benedetto del Tronto, Italy

U
Unión de Reyes
 Taretan, Mexico

Y
Yateras
 Boulder, United States

References

Cuba
Foreign relations of Cuba
Populated places in Cuba
Cities in Cuba
Cuba geography-related lists